Math, Science, and Technology (MaST) Community Charter School was founded by Karen DelGuercio in 1999. The school was established in Northeast Philadelphia in what was once an old steel factory. The school building was remodeled at the end of the 2004 school year, and two years later expansion led to the construction of a new school building. In the last five years a library and media center, a fitness center, and a maker studio have been added. 
In 2014, MaST was one of four Philadelphia public schools to exceed the national average SAT score.

External links

MaST Community Charter School Website

Notes

MaST Community Charter School
MaST Community Charter School
MaST Community Charter School
School District of Philadelphia
Public high schools in Pennsylvania
1999 establishments in Pennsylvania